King Fahd Hospital may refer to:

King Fahd University Hospital, Khobar, Saudi Arabia
King Fahad Specialist Hospital Dammam, Saudi Arabia
King Fahad Hospital Jeddah, Saudi Arabia

See also
King Fahd Medical City, Riyadh, Saudi Arabia